FNN Date Line was the last news program of the night on Fuji Television.  It was broadcast with that name from October 1987 to March 1990.

History

Until March 1988, the program was a baseball show. After the first half of April 1988, it became a general news program.

After April 1990, the program was renamed "FNN Newscom".

Broadcasters
 Weekday October 1987 - March 1988: Shigeru Tsuyuki, Michiko Yamamura, Shinya Sasaki (Another news anchor, Michiko Yamamura, left the show in less than two months) 
 Weekday April, 1988 - March 1989: Akio Ueda, Mina Koide 
 Weekday April, 1989 - March 1990: Tarō Kimura, Noriko Matsuo 
 Weekend October, 1987 - March 1988: Nobumichi Nagashima, Monta Mino, Tomoko Oshima 
 Weekend April, 1988 - March 1990: Hideki Yamanaka

Fuji News Network
Japanese television news shows
Fuji TV original programming
1987 Japanese television series debuts
1990 Japanese television series endings
1980s Japanese television series
1990s Japanese television series